The Good Place is an American fantasy comedy television series created by Michael Schur. It premiered on NBC on September 19, 2016, and concluded on January 30, 2020, after four seasons and 53 episodes.

Although the plot evolves significantly over the course of the series, the initial premise follows Eleanor Shellstrop (Kristen Bell), a woman welcomed after her death to the Good Place, a highly selective Heaven-like utopia designed and run by afterlife "architect" Michael (Ted Danson) as a reward for her righteous life. She realizes, however, she was sent there by mistake and must hide her morally imperfect past behavior while trying to become a better, more ethical person. William Jackson Harper, Jameela Jamil, and Manny Jacinto co-star as other residents of the Good Place, with D'Arcy Carden as Janet, an artificial being who assists the residents.

The Good Place received critical acclaim for its originality, writing, acting, setting, and tone. The first season's twist ending and the show's exploration and creative use of ethics and philosophy were specifically praised. Among other accolades, it received a Peabody Award and four Hugo Awards for Best Dramatic Presentation, Short Form. It was nominated for 14 Primetime Emmy Awards, including Outstanding Comedy Series for its third and fourth seasons.

Premise and synopsis

The series is centered around an afterlife in which humans are sent to "the Good Place" or "the Bad Place" after death. All humans are assigned a numerical score based on the morality of their conduct in life, and only those with the very highest scores are sent to the Good Place, where they enjoy eternal happiness with their every wish granted, guided by an artificial intelligence named Janet; all others experience an eternity of torture in the Bad Place.

In the first season, amoral loner Eleanor and small-time criminal Jason believe that they have been sent to the Good Place incorrectly. Eleanor's assigned soulmate, Chidi, a moral philosopher, attempts to teach them ethics so they can earn their presence there. Jason's soulmate, wealthy socialite Tahani, attempts to help Michael, the kindly designer of their neighborhood, deal with the chaos apparently caused by Eleanor and Jason's presence. In the season finale, Eleanor realizes that the four humans have actually been in an experimental Bad Place all along, chosen by Michael to torture each other emotionally and psychologically for eternity.

In the second season, Michael repeatedly erases the humans' memories to try to restart their psychological torture, but they figure out the truth each time. Michael's failures result in him being blackmailed by another demon who wants his job, so Michael convinces the humans to help him fool his boss in exchange for passage to the real Good Place. When Michael sees that humans can improve their goodness after they die, he appeals their case to the eternal Judge, who rules that the humans may be returned to their lives on Earth, with no memory of the afterlife, to attempt to prove their moral development.

Back on Earth in the third season, the group participates in a research study led by Chidi and his colleague Simone. Once they learn the truth about the afterlife, they try to help others improve their moral behavior. Eventually they discover that no one has been admitted to the Good Place in centuries. They propose that the points system is fundamentally flawed and set up an experimental simulated Good Place to test their thesis that humans can develop morally with proper support.

In the final season, the year-long experiment eventually proves that humans can show moral improvement in the afterlife. The group institutes a new system whereby deceased humans will earn their way into the Good Place by passing tests of moral development; and then, to avoid becoming numbed by the ennui of eternal bliss, humans may choose to exit the Good Place and peacefully end their afterlife. In the final episode, Jason, Chidi, and Eleanor eventually choose to exit; Tahani becomes a designer of afterlife environments, and Michael is allowed to be sent to Earth to live as a human.

Cast and characters

Main

 Kristen Bell as Eleanor Shellstrop, a deceased selfish American pharmaceutical saleswoman from Phoenix, Arizona, who seemingly winds up in the Good Place in error after being mistaken for a lawyer who exonerated innocent clients facing death sentences. In order to earn her spot, she recruits Chidi to teach her the fundamentals of becoming a better person.
 William Jackson Harper as Chidi Anagonye, a deceased French-speaking Nigerian-Senegalese professor of ethics and moral philosophy who taught at the Sorbonne and St. John's University in Australia. Although he has a kind and supportive nature, his inability to make choices frequently leaves him overanxious and indecisive, often resulting in poor decision-making. Assigned as Eleanor's soulmate in Michael's first Good Place experiment, he gives her ethics lessons in an attempt to make her a better person.
 Jameela Jamil as Tahani Al-Jamil, a deceased wealthy British philanthropist and fashion model who believes she belongs in the Good Place. She forms an unlikely friendship with Eleanor, who initially dislikes her positive attitude, condescending way of speaking, and tendency to name-drop.
 D'Arcy Carden as Janet, a programmed guide and knowledge bank who acts as the Good Place's main source of information and can provide its residents with whatever they desire. She is described as a foundational mainframe for all neighborhoods across the Good and Bad Places. Later, Janet gains a more humanlike disposition and begins to act differently from the way she was designed.
 Carden also portrays multiple Janet iterations throughout the series. Among them are "Bad Janet", a Bad Place counterpart specifically designed by the demons to respond to residents in an inappropriate and impolite manner; "Neutral Janet", an impartial, robotic version of Janet that works in the Accountant's Office; "Disco Janet" who is "fun, but a lot" and, in "Janet(s)", Janet-versions of Eleanor, Chidi, Tahani, and Jason.
 Manny Jacinto as Jason Mendoza, a deceased  Filipino American amateur disc jockey and drug dealer from Jacksonville, Florida, who seemingly winds up in the Good Place by mistake. He is introduced as Jianyu Li, a Taiwanese Buddhist monk who took a vow of silence. Later, Jason proves to be an immature, simple but kindhearted Jacksonville Jaguars and Blake Bortles fan.
 Ted Danson as Michael, a Bad Place architect who runs the Good Place neighborhood in which Eleanor, Chidi, Tahani, and Jason reside. Michael has a fascination with the mundane aspects of human life, like playing with paper clips or searching for one's car keys. In the first-season finale, it is revealed that he has been tricking the four humans all along and is actually a demon torturing them, though he later teams up with and befriends them. "Michael" is a Hebrew name meaning "who is like God". The character of Michael was based on the archangel Michael.

Recurring

Demons
 Tiya Sircar as Vicky, a Bad Place demon who portrays the "real Eleanor Shellstrop", whose position in the Good Place Eleanor supposedly stole in the first season. In the second season, when Michael's plans repeatedly fail, she tries to blackmail Michael into giving her control over the neighborhood. Late in the series, Michael places her in charge of introducing the other demons to the revised afterlife system.
 Adam Scott as Trevor, a cruel Bad Place demon who bullies the main group. He makes a return in the third season posing as an overenthusiastic member of Chidi's academic study on Earth, only to be later exiled by the Judge upon being discovered.
 Marc Evan Jackson as Shawn, Michael's wicked boss. Shawn gives Michael two chances to pull off the torture experiment and later turns against him when he finds out about Michael's betrayal. He is also the main character of the spin-off series The Selection.
 Luke Guldan as Chris Baker, a muscular Bad Place demon assigned as Eleanor's soulmate in the second attempt. Chris was sent to the experimental Good Place disguised as "Linda". His mission was to distract Eleanor and the others so the Bad Place could kidnap Good Janet and replace her with a Bad Janet.
 Jama Williamson as Val, a demon and Shawn's secretary. 
 Amy Okuda as Gayle, a Bad Place demon pretending to be a Good Place resident by the name of Jessica. She shows a lack of interest in the humans, despite Shawn's obsession. 
 Steve Berg as Chuck, a Bad Place demon pretending to be a Good Place resident by the name of Gunnar. His preferred form of punishment is chewing. 
 Bambadjan Bamba as Bambadjan, a Bad Place demon pretending to be a lawyer in the Good Place. He is among the more cunning of Shawn's demons. 
 Josh Siegal as Glenn, a Bad Place demon pretending to be a cheerfully dopey Good Place resident. He is among the few demons to show actual concern for another being. He blows up in "Tinker, Tailor, Demon, Spy", although Michael stated that he would reconstitute himself with time, having to relive the life cycle of a demon.
Joe Mande as the voice of Toddrick "Todd" Hemple, a lava monster who refuses to wear a human suit.

Humans
 Maribeth Monroe as Mindy St. Claire, a deceased corporate lawyer and addict who died in the process of founding a charity she had planned during a cocaine high. The charity generated enough good points after her death that her point total exceeded that required to enter the Good Place. As a compromise, the Judge ruled that she would receive her own private Medium Place, where everything is mediocre and grounded in the 1980s.
 Kirby Howell-Baptiste as Simone Garnett, an Australian neuroscientist and, briefly, Chidi's girlfriend. She is also the second test subject to be sent to the experimental Good Place, although she initially believed that she was experiencing a brain-death hallucination. 
 Eugene Cordero as Steven "Pillboi" Peleaz, Jason's best friend and partner in crime. Jason, Tahani and Michael manage to convince him to avoid criminal behaviour and focus on his career in elder care so that he could get into the Good Place.
 Ben Lawson as Larry Hemsworth, Tahani's former boyfriend and the fictional fourth Hemsworth brother. Despite being a very attractive, successful paediatric surgeon, he constantly berates himself. 
 Rebecca Hazlewood as Kamilah Al-Jamil, Tahani's exceedingly successful and competitive younger sister. Tahani died attempting to humiliate her.
 Ajay Mehta as Waqas Al-Jamil, Tahani's father.
 Anna Khaja as Manisha Al-Jamil, Tahani's mother.
 Leslie Grossman as Donna Shellstrop, Eleanor's cruel, self-centered, negligent mother. In the third season, it is revealed that she faked her death in Arizona and has found peace as a PTA mom in a Nevada suburb.
 Angela Trimbur as Madison, Eleanor's roommate. 
 Meryl Hathaway as Brittany, Eleanor's roommate.
 Mitch Narito as Donkey Doug, Jason's dopey father. Jason, Tahani and Michael's plan to get him into the Good Place by convincing him to become a qualified electrician fails after Donkey Doug plans several robberies as part of a get-rich-quick scheme involving a combined energy drink and body spray product.
 Keston John as Uzo, Chidi's best friend. He had long suffered from Chidi's indecisiveness and witnessed Chidi's original death.
 Brandon Scott Jones as John Wheaton, the first test subject sent to the experimental Good Place. In life, he was a gossip columnist and published trashy articles, especially about Tahani.
 Ben Koldyke as Brent Norwalk, a bigoted and arrogant corporate chief executive, and the fourth test subject sent to the experimental Good Place.
 Michael McKean and Noah Garfinkel as Doug Forcett. Michael keeps a picture of Garfinkel as Forcett on his office wall as a reminder of the human who during a magic mushroom high almost understood the afterlife points system (with many major religions only understanding about five percent of it). In a later episode, Michael McKean appears as an older Forcett trying to live the best life possible on Earth, much to the detriment of his own happiness. Garfinkel appears as Forcett in the final episode.

Other celestial beings
 Jason Mantzoukas as Derek, a malfunctioning artificial rebound boyfriend created by Janet. Gifted by the humans to Mindy for helping them escape the fake Good Place, he was repeatedly rebooted for privacy or amusement. He serves as a template for the 'Janet baby' Good Place residents for Eleanor and Michael's experiment.
 Maya Rudolph as Gen, the judge who rules on interdimensional matters between the Good Place and the Bad Place
 Mike O'Malley as Jeff the Doorman, the gatekeeper of the doorway between the afterlife and Earth. He has an affinity for frogs.
 Brad Morris as Matt, a suicidal accountant who works in a neutral office between the Good Place and the Bad Place. He is assigned as the accountant for Eleanor and Michael's experiment. He had been formerly assigned to evaluating "Weird Sex Things" in Accounting, which accounted for nearly all case studies of unprecedented human behaviour.
 Paul Scheer as Chuck, leader of the Good Place committee. Ostensibly wanting to help Eleanor and her friends, he is very hesitant to take any actual action and is overly deferential to any demands by the Bad Place in negotiations. Chuck and the rest of the committee abandon the Good Place after inducting Michael as a resident (and its new leader), having run out of ideas of how to lift the sense of ennui hanging over its residents.
 Stephen Merchant as Neil, the manager in the Accounting office where all the life points are calculated. He reveals that nobody has been sent to the Good Place for about 500 years.
 Nicole Byer as Gwendolyn, an optimistic and bubbly mailwoman who works at the Good Place Correspondent Centre. She is naive and was quick to believe that the main group had won a raffle to a free tour of the Good Place. She also guided Michael how to contact the Good Place committee. Despite being quietly furious after she realized the group was lying to her, she was still able to kindly wave them goodbye as they joined the Judge to IHOP.

Episodes

Production

Casting

NBC issued a press release on August 13, 2015, announcing it had given the then-untitled show a 13-episode order based purely on a pitch by Michael Schur. On January 12, 2016, it was announced that Kristen Bell and Ted Danson had been cast in the lead roles for the series. The first synopsis of the show was also released, stating that it would revolve around Eleanor designing her own self-improvement course with Michael as her guide – although the afterlife element had always been a part of the series, as Bell stated she was aware of the first-season finale twist when she signed on.

William Jackson Harper was cast as Chris on February 11, 2016, though the character was renamed Chidi. Jameela Jamil was cast as Tessa on February 25, 2016, and her character was renamed Tahani. On March 3, 2016, Manny Jacinto was revealed to have been cast as a "sweet and good-natured Jason" whose "dream is to make a living as a DJ in Southern Florida". On March 14, 2016, D'Arcy Carden was cast as a series regular announced as "Janet Della-Denunzio, a violin salesperson with a checkered past" – although writer Megan Amram later admitted that this was a hoax.

Development
The show's final premise, including the afterlife element, was announced on May 15, 2016, when NBC announced its 2016–17 TV season.

According to Schur, they originally planned to include religious elements after doing research on various faiths and groups. Instead, he decided on a more diverse concept that included all faiths and was free of religious views. "I stopped doing research because I realized it's about versions of ethical behavior, not religious salvation," he says. "The show isn't taking a side, the people who are there are from every country and religion." He also pointed out that the setting (shot in San Marino, California's Huntington Gardens) already had the feeling of a pastiche of different cultures, and said the neighborhoods would feature people who were part of nondenominational and interdenominational backgrounds who interacted with each other regardless of religion.

The series' setting and premises, as well as the serialized cliffhangers, were modeled on Lost, a favorite of Schur's. One of the first people he called when he developed the series was Lost co-creator Damon Lindelof. "I took him to lunch and said, 'We're going to play a game [of] 'Is this anything?'" He then added "I imagine this going in the Lost way, with cliffhangers and future storylines."

The first season's surprise twist, that the Good Place was the Bad Place, and Chidi, Eleanor, Jason and Tahani were chosen because they were best suited to torture each other indefinitely, is very similar in premise to philosopher Jean-Paul Sartre's stage play No Exit, where three strangers die and are escorted to a single room by a friendly bellhop and informed they must co-exist. They ultimately determine they are entirely incompatible and reach the conclusion that "hell is other people". Danson and Bell were the only actors who knew the ultimate premise from the start.

Critics have also suggested similarities to 1960s surreal TV show The Prisoner in its isolated, rule-bound setting.

Broadcast and release
The series premiered September 19, 2016. On January 30, 2017, NBC renewed the series for a second season of 13 episodes, which premiered on September 20, 2017, with an hour-long opening episode. On November 21, 2017, NBC renewed the series for a 13-episode third season, which premiered on September 27, 2018. On December 4, 2018, NBC renewed the series for a fourth season, which premiered on September 26, 2019. On June 7, 2019, it was announced that the fourth season would be the last.

International
In several international territories, the show is distributed on Netflix. The first season was released September 21, 2017 and episodes of subsequent seasons became available within 24 hours of their U.S. broadcast.

Home media
All DVD releases for The Good Place were distributed by the Shout! Factory. The first season was released on DVD in region 1 on October 17, 2017, the second on July 17, 2018, and the third on July 30, 2019. The complete series was released on Blu-ray on May 19, 2020.

Reception

Ratings

Critical response

On Rotten Tomatoes, the first season has a rating of 92%, based on 74 reviews, with an average rating of 7.80/10. The site's critical consensus reads, "Kristen Bell and Ted Danson knock it out of the park with supremely entertaining, charming performances in this absurd, clever and whimsical portrayal of the afterlife." On Metacritic, the first season has a score of 78 out of 100, based on reviews from 32 critics, indicating "generally favorable reviews".

The editors of TV Guide placed The Good Place second among the top ten picks for the most anticipated new shows of the 2016–17 season. In its review from writer Liam Matthews, "NBC's new comedy has an impressive pedigree" (referring to Mike Schur and stars, Kristen Bell and Ted Danson, the latter cited as "arguably the greatest sitcom actor of all time"). Matthews concludes, "The hope is that their combined star power can restore NBC's tarnished comedy brand to its former glory. It won't be the next Friends, but it's something even better: a network comedy that feels different than anything that's come before."

On Rotten Tomatoes, the second season has a rating of 100%, based on 59 reviews, with an average rating of 9.0/10. The site's critical consensus reads, "By voluntarily blowing up its premise, The Good Place sets up a second season that proves even funnier than its first." On Metacritic, the second season has a score of 87 out of 100, based on reviews from 10 critics, indicating "universal acclaim".

On Rotten Tomatoes, the third season has a rating of 98%, based on 47 reviews, with an average rating of 8.35/10. The site's critical consensus reads, "Charming and curious as ever, The Good Place remains a delightfully insightful bright spot on the television landscape." On Metacritic, the third season has a score of 96 out of 100, based on reviews from five critics, indicating "universal acclaim".

On Rotten Tomatoes, the fourth season has a rating of 100%, based on 52 reviews, with an average rating of 8.3/10. The site's critical consensus reads, "A wild philosophical ride to the very end, The Good Place brings it home with a forking good final season."

Several critics have commended the show for its exploration and creative use of ethics and philosophy. Featured topics include the trolley problem thought experiment originally devised by Philippa Foot, the categorical imperative first formulated by Immanuel Kant, T. M. Scanlon's What We Owe to Each Other, and the works of Aristotle and Søren Kierkegaard. Andrew P. Street of The Guardian wrote that "moral philosophy is the beating heart of the program" and that the show "made philosophy seem cool." Elizabeth Yuko of The Atlantic noted that "The Good Place stands out for dramatizing actual ethics classes onscreen, without watering down the concepts being described, and while still managing to be entertaining." For their part, several philosophers have celebrated the show's largely accurate popularization of their line of work, while noting some minor inaccuracies.

Several critics have noted that The Good Place is notable for its eschewing of antiheroes and cynical themes in favor of likable characters and positive messages. James Poniewozik of The New York Times said, "The most refreshing thing about The Good Place, in an era of artistic bleakness, is its optimism about human nature. It's made humane and sidesplittingly entertaining television out of the notion that people – and even the occasional immortal demon – are redeemable." Jenna Scherer of Rolling Stone wrote that The Good Place proved that "slapstick and banter can coexist alongside tragedy and hardship – that a show doesn't need to be self-serious to be serious-minded." Erik Adams of The A.V. Club praised the show as portraying an "uncommonly decent TV world". Stuart Heritage of The Guardian called The Good Place "relentlessly optimistic", a quality which Stephanie Palumbo of Vulture called "a salve for despair in the Trump era".

In 2019, The Good Place was ranked 69th on The Guardians list of the 100 best TV shows of the 21st century.

Critics' top-ten lists

Accolades

During its airing, The Good Place received many awards and nominations. It received fourteen Primetime Emmy Award nominations during its run, including two nominations for Outstanding Comedy Series for its third and fourth seasons. It also received two Golden Globe Award nominations in 2019, including a nomination for Best Television Series – Musical or Comedy. In genre awards, the show has won four Hugo Awards for Best Dramatic Presentation, Short Form for "The Trolley Problem", "Janet(s)", "The Answer", and "Whenever You're Ready"; it has also been nominated two other times in the category. The show also received three consecutive nominations from the Saturn Awards for Best Fantasy Television Series and three nominations from the Nebula Awards for the Ray Bradbury Award, winning once for the latter. In 2017, the American Film Institute named the show as one of its top 10 television programs of the year, and in 2019, the show received a Peabody Award for its contributions to entertainment.

Several cast members have received awards for their performances on the show. Danson received three Emmy nominations for Outstanding Lead Actor in a Comedy Series for his performance as Michael. He has also been nominated for three Critics' Choice Television Awards (winning one in 2018), two Satellite Awards, and a TCA Award for his work. Bell was nominated for a Golden Globe for Best Actress in a Television Series – Musical or Comedy for her performance as Eleanor, as well as one Critics' Choice Television Award, two People's Choice Awards (winning one in 2019), one Teen Choice Award, and one TCA Award. Maya Rudolph has received three Emmy nominations for Outstanding Guest Actress in a Comedy Series, and Harper, Jamil, Carden, and Adam Scott have all received nominations for awards for their work on the show.

Philosophical inspirations

The Good Place makes use of many different theories of moral philosophy and ethics through the character of Chidi Anagonye, the moral philosophy professor. Within the show, there is reference to John Locke, Tim Scanlon, Peter Singer, and Derek Parfit, and "the show has covered everything from Jonathan Dancy's theory of moral particularism, to Aristotelian virtue ethics, to Kantian deontology, to moral nihilism." UCLA philosophy professor Pamela Hieronymi and Clemson philosophy professor Todd May served as consultants to the show. They both made cameo appearances in the final episode.

The beginning of The Good Place takes its inspiration from the idiom "Hell is other people" from Jean-Paul Sartre's play No Exit. In the play three people are trapped in Hell, represented as one room, and they torture one another psychologically while reflecting upon the sins that got them there. The concept "Hell is other people" is an often-misunderstood philosophical idiom meant to reflect that "Hell is other people because you are, in some sense, forever trapped within them, subject to their apprehension of you."

The second season's philosophy is most closely related to that of Aristotle, with Schur in particular highlighting Aristotle's "practice-makes-perfect" attitude to acting ethically. Chidi's impenetrable 4,000 page ethical treatise was inspired by Parfit's On What Matterswhich attempts "to propose a grand unified theory of all ethical theories". Schur was unable to finish reading due to its length. Tim Scanlon's What We Owe to Each Other "forms the spine of the entire show" according to Schur. The book presents the idea of contractualism: the idea is that "to act morally is to abide by principles that no one could reasonably reject". The show and the relationships between the characters act as an investigation into contractualism with the four main humans, Michael, and Janet forming their own society whereby they must act in ways that no one could reasonably reject even when that goes against the rules and tenets of higher powers. The overarching thesis of the show, greatly influenced by the contractualist theory, is "the point of morality... isn't to accumulate goodness points, as in the elaborate point system the organizers of the Good Place and its corresponding Bad Place employ to determine who goes to which upon death. It's to live up to our duties to each other."

The Selection
In September 2019, prior to the release of the fourth season of The Good Place, NBC released a six-episode web series on their website, app, and their YouTube channel, titled The Selection (full title: The Good Place Presents: The Selection), directed by Eric Kissack. The series, set during an ellipsis taking place during the season 3 episode 11: "Chidi Sees the Time-Knife", follows Michael's former demon boss Shawn as he and his underlings decide which four people to pick for Michael's new incarnation of "the Good Place". Marc Evan Jackson, Josh Siegal, Bambadjan Bamba, Amy Okuda, and Jama Williamson form the main cast by reprising their roles from The Good Place as Shawn and his underlings, with Joe Mande reprising his role as Toddrick "Todd" Hemple in the third episode. At the 72nd Primetime Emmy Awards, the series was nominated for Outstanding Short Form Comedy or Drama Series.

Explanatory notes

References

External links

 
 

 
2010s American sitcoms
2020s American sitcoms
2016 American television series debuts
2020 American television series endings
American fantasy television series
Angels in television
Demons in television
English-language television shows
Fantasy comedy television series
Fiction about memory erasure and alteration
Fiction about the afterlife
Heaven in popular culture
Hell in popular culture
Hugo Award-winning television series
NBC original programming
Peabody Award-winning television programs
Philosophical fiction
Philosophy television series
Television series about parallel universes
Television series by 3 Arts Entertainment
Television series by Fremulon
Television series by Universal Television
Television series created by Michael Schur
Television shows about death
Television shows featuring audio description
Television shows filmed in California
Television shows set in Australia
Television shows set in Phoenix, Arizona
Television shows set in Florida